M. tinctoria may refer to:
 Maclura tinctoria, the old fustic, a medium to large tree species found from Mexico to Argentina
 Morinda tinctoria, the aal or Indian mulberry, a plant species

See also
 Tinctoria